Yekaterinovka is a rural locality (a selo) in Fyodorovsky Selsoviet of Yenotayevsky District, Astrakhan Oblast, Russia. The population was 6 as of 2010. There are 2 streets.

Geography 
Yekaterinovka is located 22 km north of Yenotayevka (the district's administrative centre) by road. Dedushkin is the nearest rural locality.

References 

Rural localities in Yenotayevsky District